Bathwala is a small village located on the west of Gurdaspur, Punjab, India. It is also been known as village of exclusive Johal's (also known as Sardaran Da Bathwala and Jattan Da Bathwala ).

History 
The village was established by ancestors of Johal's and landlord Jatt known as Nathu Shah Johal and later by his three sons.

Sports 
The Johal's are also been famous to taking part in Sports. The foundation Youth Sports Club was established by Member of Parliament and Film Actor Mr. Vinod Khana in 1997. They are continuously hosting cricket tournaments from past fifteen years and body building competitions in the area. Rather than sports they are also famous in Flok Dance ' Bhangra '. They had several gold medals in state level competitions.

Famous Sports Personalities 
 Parminder Johal (International Basketball Player)
 Surinder Johal (National Cricketer)
 Manjinder Johal (National Cricketer)
 Jonny Johal (National Cricketer)
 Gagandeep Johal (National Cricketer)
 Parminder Johal(senior) (National Cricketer)

Festivals 
The Vaisakhi is the most famous among the residents of Bathwala. It is celebrated as the birthday of Khalsa. SHARDAI and GARRAKU (pakoras of spiritual Bhang leaves) are famous and popular on the occasion of Vaisakhi. Else than Vaisakhi, Holi the festival colours and Dewali the festival of lights are the favorites among the people of Bathwala.

Villages in Gurdaspur district